Giulio Rossi was a Roman Catholic prelate who served as Bishop of San Leone (1555–1564).

Biography
On 23 Oct 1555, Giulio Rossi was appointed during the papacy of Pope Leo X as Bishop of San Leone. He served as Bishop of San Leone until his death in March 1564.

References 

16th-century Italian Roman Catholic bishops
Bishops appointed by Pope Leo X
Year of birth unknown
1654 deaths